Hackettstown or Hacketstown may refer to:

 Hackettstown, New Jersey, a town in New Jersey, USA
 Hacketstown, a village in County Carlow, Ireland